Michael Quane (born 1934) is an Irish former hurler who played at club level with Glen Rovers and at inter-county level with the Cork senior hurling team. He usually lined out as a forward.

Playing career

Quane first came to prominence with the Newmarket club before transferring to Glen Rovers in Cork. He first lined out with the senior team in 1955 and won four Cork SHC titles in total. Quane first appeared on the inter-county scene as a member of the Cork junior hurling team that won the All-Ireland JHC title in 1955. He captained the juniors to a second All-Ireland crown in 1958, while also being drafted onto the Cork senior hurling team that year. Quane went on to line out in three successive Munster finals without success.

Honours

Glen Rovers
Cork Senior Hurling Championship: 1958, 1959, 1960, 1962

Cork
All-Ireland Junior Hurling Championship: 1955, 1958(c)
Munster Junior Hurling Championship: 1955, 1958 (c)

References

1934 births
Living people
Glen Rovers hurlers
Cork inter-county hurlers